Jukka-Pekka Siili (born 17 September 1964), often billed as JP Siili, is a Finnish film director and screenwriter. While also frequently working for television, he is best known for having directed films Hymypoika, Ganes and Härmä.

Selected filmography
Films
Hymypoika (2003)
Young Gods (2003)
Ganes (2007)
 Blackout (2008)
Härmä (2012)
Selänne (2013)
Veljeni vartija (2018)

Television
Sydänten akatemia (1998)
Juulian totuudet (2002)
Rakastuin mä luuseriin (2005)
Tellus (2014)

References

External links

1964 births
Finnish film directors
Finnish screenwriters
Living people